No Man's Land: An Investigative Journey Through Kenya and Tanzania (1994; second edition 2003) is a book by the British writer and environmental and political activist  George Monbiot.

Summary

The book details Monbiot's travels through Kenya and Tanzania, the inequality and harsh conditions he witnesses, along with the natural beauty
he observes.

Reception
No Man's Land was praised by diverse sources, from Niall Ferguson in the Daily Mail, Oliver Tickell in the Daily Telegraph and in Africa Analysis'', where it was described as 'An inquiring book by a sensitive man'.
The book is listed at the bibliography of the Tanzania Development Trust, on the reading list of various University courses and as recommended reading by the Lonely Planet Kenya guide.

References

1994 non-fiction books
Books about Tanzania
Books about Kenya
Books about Africa
Books by George Monbiot
English-language books
English non-fiction books

Investigative journalism